Clyde B. Smith (February 4, 1906 – July 9, 1976) was an American football player, coach, and college athletics administrator. He served as the head football coach at La Crosse State Teachers College—now the University of Wisconsin–La Crosse (1938–1942, 1946–1947), Indiana University (1948–1951), and Arizona State University (1952–1954), compiling a career college football record of 52–56–4. From 1955 to 1971, he was the athletic director at Arizona State.

Head coaching record

References

External links
 

1906 births
1976 deaths
Arizona State Sun Devils athletic directors
Arizona State Sun Devils football coaches
Geneva Golden Tornadoes football players
Indiana Hoosiers football coaches
Wisconsin–La Crosse Eagles football coaches
High school football coaches in Pennsylvania
People from Monongahela, Pennsylvania
Coaches of American football from Pennsylvania
Players of American football from Pennsylvania